Hervé Marie Le Cléac'h SS. CC. (11 March 1915 –  13 August 2012) was a French prelate of the Roman Catholic Church.

Hervé Marie Le Cléac'h was born in Dinéault, France, and was ordained a priest on 18 December 1943 from the Roman Catholic religious institute, the  Congregation of the Sacred Hearts of Jesus and Mary. Hervé-Marie Le Cléac'h was appointed Bishop of Taiohae o Tefenuaenatal on 1 March 1973 and received his episcopal consecration on 24 June 1973. He resigned governance of the see on 31 May 1986. Le Cléac'h died on 13 August 2012.

Notes

1915 births
2012 deaths
French Polynesian Roman Catholic bishops
20th-century Roman Catholic bishops in Oceania
People from the Marquesas Islands
People from Finistère
20th-century French Roman Catholic bishops
Roman Catholic bishops of Taiohae